John Edmund Wentworth Addison  (5 November 1838 – 22 April 1907) was a British judge and Conservative politician.

Early life
Addison was born in 1838 in Bruges, Belgium and was the third son of Lieutenant-Colonel Henry Robert Addison and his second wife, Grace Barton. Colonel Addison was born in India of Irish ancestry and after retiring from the army wrote a number of musical plays and light operas. J.E.W Addison was educated at Trinity College Dublin before being called to the bar at the Inner Temple in 1862.

Career
He practised in the Northern circuit and in 1880 became a Queen's Counsel (QC). In 1873 he married Alice McKeand of Manchester, who predeceased him in 1894. In 1874 he was appointed Recorder of Preston, a position he held for sixteen years. In 1889 Addison was the senior prosecuting counsel in the celebrated trial of Florence Maybrick.

At the 1885 general election, he was elected as Conservative Member of Parliament for Ashton under Lyne, defeating the sitting MP, Hugh Mason. At the ensuing general election in 1886 he drew with his Liberal opponent. He was elected by the casting vote of the borough's mayor as returning officer. He held the seat at the 1892 election before standing down from parliament in 1895.

On leaving the Commons in 1895, Addison was appointed a county court judge in Norfolk and Cambridgeshire. In 1897 he was transferred to the Southwark County Court, where he presided until his retirement due to ill health in 1906.

Judge Addison died at his residence at Hyde Park, London in April 1907, aged 68.

References

External links 
 

1838 births
1907 deaths
Conservative Party (UK) MPs for English constituencies
UK MPs 1885–1886
UK MPs 1886–1892
UK MPs 1892–1895
Members of the Inner Temple
20th-century English judges
Alumni of Trinity College Dublin
Members of the Parliament of the United Kingdom for Ashton-under-Lyne
County Court judges (England and Wales)
19th-century English judges